Based in both Berlin and London, the London International School of Performing Arts (LISPA) was founded in 2003 by Thomas Prattki - the former pedagogical director of the Jacques Lecoq International School of Theatre (Ecole Jacques Lecoq) in Paris - along with Amy Russell, who was Chair of the Naropa University MFA in Lecoq-Based Actor Created Physical Theater. LISPA was a private educational institution offering full-time postgraduate Masters-level training programs in Devising Theatre based on the teachings of Jacques Lecoq, as well as short workshops and a regular Summer School before finally closing as a school in 2018.

Locations 
LISPA began life at the Playground Studios, Latimer Road, London. Due to increased student numbers, an additional studio was used in Hackney, North London and the courses ran for a number of years as double groups. Eventually in January 2008 the whole school moved to a studio and office in 3 Mills studios, East London.

From January 2016 onwards, all full-time courses and most short courses took place in Berlin, Germany.

LISPA ran its last season in 2017-18 before its official closure.

Courses

Devising Theatre and Performance - DTAP (formerly Initiation course)

Advanced Devising Practice - ADP (formerly Advanced course)

Workshops 
In addition to the full-time courses LISPA had a yearly Summer School and a regular workshop in association with the London International Mime Festival in January of each year, as well as various bespoke workshops throughout the year.

References

External links
 

Schools of the performing arts in London